better known by his pseudonym  was a Japanese writer of adventure fiction.

Biography
Funado was born as Kenji Harada on February 8, 1944.  During his student days, he traveled to Alaska. He graduated from Waseda University. Funado wrote approximately 30 stories for the manga series Golgo 13, three of which he later novelized in 2011.

Funado made his debut as an adventure novel writer in 1979. After writing some prize-winning adventure novels, in 2000 he won the Naoki Prize for his novel May in the Valley of the Rainbow. In February 2015, he published the last volume of his nine-volume novel series on the history of Manchukuo.

Funado died of thymic cancer on April 22, 2015 in Suginami, Tokyo.

Works in English translation
May in the Valley of the Rainbow (original title: Niji no Tani no Gogatsu), trans. Eve Nyren (Vertical, 2006)

Awards
Japan Adventure Fiction Association Prize
 1985 - Yamaneko no Natsu (Summer of the Wildcat)
 1988 - Takeki Hakobune
 1989 - Densetsu Naki Chi
 1992 - Suna no Kuronikuru (Sand Chronicle)
 1996 - Ezochi Bekken
 2004 - Yume wa Arechi o
Other awards
 1985 - Yoshikawa Eiji Prize for New Writers: Yamaneko no Natsu (Summer of the Wildcat)
 1988 - The Best Japanese Crime Fiction of the Year (Kono Mystery ga Sugoi! 1988): Densetsu Naki Chi
 1989 - Mystery Writers of Japan Award for Best Novel: Densetsu Naki Chi
 1992 - Yamamoto Shūgorō Prize: Suna no Kuronikuru (Sand Chronicle)
 1993 - The Best Japanese Crime Fiction of the Year (Kono Mystery ga Sugoi! 1993): Suna no Kuronikuru (Sand Chronicle)
 2000 - Naoki Prize: May in the Valley of the Rainbow
 2014 - Japan Mystery Literature Award for Lifetime Achievement

Main works
 Higōhōin (1979)
 Chi to Yume (1982)
 Yamaneko no Natsu (lit. Summer of the Wildcat) (1984)
 Takeki Hakobune (1987)
 Densetsu Naki Chi (1988)
 Midori no Soko no Soko (1989)
 Suna no Kuronikuru (lit. Sand Chronicle) (1991)
 Ezochi Bekken (1995)
 Niji no Tani no Gogatsu (2000) (May in the Valley of the Rainbow. Vertical. 2006) 
 Yume wa Arechi o (2003)
 Kahan ni Shirube Naku (lit. No Sign on the Riverside) (2006)
 Manshukoku Engi (2007–2015) (nine volumes)

References

1944 births
2015 deaths
20th-century Japanese novelists
21st-century Japanese novelists
Japanese crime fiction writers
Spy fiction writers
Mystery Writers of Japan Award winners
Japanese historical novelists
People from Shimonoseki
Writers from Yamaguchi Prefecture
Waseda University alumni
Deaths from cancer in Japan
Deaths from thymus cancer